This is a list of volcanic eruptions in the 21st century with a Volcanic explosivity index (VEI) of 4 or higher, and smaller eruptions that resulted in fatalities, significant damage or disruptions.

See also
List of volcanic eruptions 1500–1999
List of large Holocene volcanic eruptions
List of largest volcanic eruptions
List of natural disasters by death toll
List of volcanic eruptions by death toll
Lists of volcanoes

References

External links
 VEI glossary entry from a USGS website
 How to measure the size of a volcanic eruption, from The Guardian
 The size and frequency of the largest explosive eruptions on Earth, a 2004 article from the Bulletin of Volcanology
 List of Large Holocene Eruptions (VEI > 4) from the Smithsonian Global Volcanism Program
 VEI (Volcanic Explosivity Index) from the Global Volcanism Program of the Smithsonian National Museum of Natural History

Volcanic Eruptions of the 21st century
Lists of 21st-century disasters
21st century